Gall (c. 1840 – December 5, 1894), Lakota Phizí, was an important military leader of the Hunkpapa Lakota in the Battle of the Little Bighorn. He spent four years in exile in Canada with Sitting Bull's people, after the wars ended and surrendered in 1881 to live on the Standing Rock Reservation. He would eventually advocate for the assimilation of his people to reservation life and served as a tribal judge in his later years.

Early Years
Born in present-day South Dakota around 1840, and orphaned, Gall was said to receive his name after eating the gall of an animal killed by a neighbour.

An accomplished warrior by his late teens, Gall became a war chief in his twenties. As a Lakota war leader in the long conflict against United States intrusion onto tribal lands, Gall served with Sitting Bull during several battles, including the famous Battle of the Little Bighorn in 1876.

Battle of the Little Bighorn

Since the early 1980s, archaeological researchers conducted battlefield excavations after a major grass fire.  Historians have been studying accounts by participating  Native Americans and tribal oral histories.  Based on these elements, a contemporary reassessment of the Battle of the Little Bighorn has given Gall greater credit for several crucial tactical decisions that contributed to the Sioux and Cheyenne's overpowering defeat of the five companies of cavalry led by Custer of the 7th Cavalry.  

Major Marcus Reno's initial attack on the southeast end of the  Native American village killed Gall's two wives and several children.  Gall described it: "My heart was very bad that day."  During the opening phase of the battle, the Lakota and Cheyenne repulsed Reno's three companies of cavalry from the south-eastern end of their large village.  Gall was one of the few  Native Americans to suspect that Custer's strategy was probably a two-pronged attack.  He believed that determining the location of the other half of Custer's attacking force was critical to  Native American defense.

Gall crossed the river and rode to the northeast, where he spied Custer's chief scout, Mitch Bouyer, returning to Custer from an overwatch of the  Native American village.  After locating the main element of Custer's five companies, Gall correctly determined that they probably intended to force a river crossing and an entrance into the northern end of the village.  Riding back down from the bluffs, Gall told Sioux and Cheyenne forces returning from Reno's repulse of his suspicions.  With Crazy Horse, he led forces north across the river to drive Company E and F due north up present-day Calhoun Couley to present-day Finley Ridge. There they forced three of Custer's companies to fight a largely defensive battle.

Within minutes, Gall and his forces took a  position north east of Finley Ridge and poured a withering fire down on Companies C, I and L. When Crazy Horse charged through an opening between Lt Calhoun's Company L and Company I in a sudden surprise right envelopment attack,  Company L probably began to pull back off the ridge to try to link up with Company I.  Companies C and L's tried to redeploy from holding off Gall's men to the east and others to the south.  This probably looked like a panicked retreat to Gall and his forces.

Seeing that the two Cavalry companies no longer had the fire superiority that held the  Native Americans at bay, Gall and his men attacked from the east as the other Indians attacked the cut-off elements of Company C from both the east and the south.  They soon finished off Companies C and L, and forced  survivors and some of Company I to flee towards Custer and his men north of the so-called "Last Stand Hill."  A few of the soldiers of Companies C, I and L also fled south toward the river.  The places where they fell were later marked by white marble monuments, which still stand.

Soon the  Native Americans finished off Custer and his men in the remaining companies C, E, and F.  The last approximately 28 survivors made a dash south for the river. They were trapped in the box canyon called "Deep Ravine".  After killing them, the Indians had won the battle, having completely annihilated Custer's five companies.

In later years, Gall recounted his role in the battle.  He had mistakenly thought the survivors of Custer's three southeastern companies fled northwest to Custer because they ran out of ammunition.  The horse soldiers may also have fled after losing their will to fight, as many men simply ran, even abandoning loaded rifles.  The Sioux and Cheyenne picked these up and fired the weapons to drive off the soldiers' horses, thus depriving them of a key tactical mobility advantage. The native warriors' attacking Greasy Grass Ridge from the southeast came mostly on foot.  Gall kept up enfilading fire from the northeast.

Later years

In late 1876, many of the Hunkpapa bands crossed over the border into Canada, where they struggled to survive for the next several years. Gall came to disagree with Sitting Bull and brought his band back to the United States surrendering at Fort Buford, Dakota Territory on January 3, 1881. On May 26, 1881, he and his followers were loaded onto steamers (along with Crow King, Black Moon, Low Dog and Fools Heart) and shipped downriver to the Standing Rock Indian Reservation. The first complete census of the Lakota at Standing Rock, taken in the fall of 1881 listed Gall with a band of 52 families, totaling 230 people.

Becoming a farmer, Gall encouraged his people to assimilate to reservation life. He also converted to Christianity, took the additional name Abraham, and served as a judge on the reservation's Court of Indian Affairs. He became friendly with the Indian Agent, James McLaughlin. The 1885 reservation census listed Gall as responsible for 22 lodges and 114 people.

Eventually Gall disagreed with Sitting Bull, who had become involved with the Ghost Dance movement, and who was killed by a tribal policeman in a bungled confrontation in 1890.

Death
Gall lived on the Standing Rock Agency until his death at his Oak Creek home on December 5, 1894. He is buried in Saint Elizabeth Episcopal Cemetery in Wakpala, South Dakota. In 1991, his remains were exhumed because a Utah state park museum purported to have his skull, but his remains were found intact.

Notes

References

Dickson, Ephriam D. III. The Sitting Bull Surrender Census: The Lakotas at Standing Rock Agency, 1881. Pierre: South Dakota State Historical Society Press, 2010.
Grant, Bruce. The Concise Encyclopedia of the American Indian, 3rd ed. New York: Wings Books, 2000.
Larson, Robert W. Gall: Lakota War Chief. Norman: University of Oklahoma Press, 2007.
Shumate, Jane. Chief Gall Sioux War Chief. Chelsea House Publishers, 1995.
Appears In The Second Expansion Of The Game Strategy "Age Of Empires III" With The Civilization Sioux, 2006.

1840s births
1894 deaths
Lakota leaders
Native American leaders
Native American people of the Indian Wars
People from North Dakota
People from South Dakota
People of the Great Sioux War of 1876
Battle of the Little Bighorn
Hunkpapa people